The table below details the Grand Prix results of the other teams for which Renault was/is an engine supplier.

Complete Formula One results

Lotus, Ligier, Tyrrell (1983–1986)
(key)

Williams, Ligier, Benetton (1989–2001)
(key)

Red Bull (2007–2010)
(key)

Red Bull, Lotus, Caterham, Williams, Toro Rosso (2011–2017)
(key)

McLaren (2018–2020)
(key)

Alpine (2021–)
(key)

Notes
 * – Season still in progress.
 † – The driver did not finish the Grand Prix, but was classified, as he completed over 90% of the race distance.
 ‡ – Half points awarded as less than 75% of the race distance was completed.

References

Formula One constructor results
Renault in Formula One